Antonis Kapnidis (born 15 August 1992) is a Greek professional footballer who plays as a forward for Super League 2 club Proodeftiki.

Career
Kapnidis began his career at the infrastructure segments of his hometown club Iraklis. At age 19, Kapnidis was transferred to Agrotikos Asteras in the second division, where he had 31 appearances and scored one goal. In the summer of 2012, he signed with Doxa Drama, where he stayed until January 2013. He then moved to Anagennisi Giannitsa, where he had 20 appearances and one goal by the end of the year. In the 2013–14 season, he played for Football League North side Kavala, scoring seven times in 23 matches. 

His performances with Kavala drew the attention of renowned former Superleague regulars Aris, which at the time played in the third national Division, due to financial problems. In his first season with Aris, Kapnidis scored 10 goals in 30 appearances, but the club narrowly missed out on promotion as they finished in second place. In his second season with the club, Kapnidis scored 21 goals in 29 appearances, helping Aris promote to the Football League. On 12 July 2016, he was rewarded for his outstanding performances, with a new three-year contract. His playing time was however significantly limited, and on 30 January 2018 Kapnidis opted to terminate his contract with the club on mutual consent.

He signed with fellow Football League side Doxa Drama, but made only 6 appearances for the club before being released from his contract after filing a claim against the club for unpaid wages. In the summer of 2018, Kapnidis joined fellow Football League team Ergotelis on a two-year contract.

In July 2021 he signed a year contract with Lithuanian FK Panevėžys.

Career statistics

References

1992 births
Living people
Footballers from Thessaloniki
Greek footballers
Greek expatriate footballers
Association football forwards
Football League (Greece) players
Doxa Drama F.C. players
Kavala F.C. players
Aris Thessaloniki F.C. players
Ergotelis F.C. players
Veria NFC players